This is an incomplete list of rivers of  Manitoba, a province of Canada.

Watersheds
The entire province of Manitoba is within the Hudson Bay drainage basin:

Nelson River
Lake Winnipeg watershed
Winnipeg River
Red River
Assiniboine River
Qu'Appelle River
Souris River
Saskatchewan River
Lake Winnipegosis watershed

List of rivers

A
Antler River
Armit River
Armstrong River
Assean River
Assiniboine River

B
Beaver Creek
Berens River
Black Duck Creek
Black Duck River
Bloodvein River
Bolton River
Boots Creek
Boundary Creek
Boyne River
Broad River
Brokenhead River
Burntwood River

C
Caribou River
Carrot River
Churchill River
Cochrane River
Cypress River

D
Dauphin River

E
Echimamish River
Echoing River

F
Fairford River
Fox River

G
Gainsborough Creek
Gods River
Goose Creek
Goose River
Graham Creek
Grass River

H
Hargrave River
Hayes River

J
Joe River

L
La Salle River
Leslie Creek
Limestone River
Little Churchill River
Little Partridge River
Little Saskatchewan River

M
Manigotagan River
Minago River
Mink River
Minnedosa River
Mistik Creek

N
Nelson River

O
Omand's Creek
Owl River

P
Pasquatchai River
Pembina River
Pineroot River
Pipestone Creek
Plum Creek
Poplar River

Q
Qu'Appelle River

R
Rat River (Burntwood River tributary)
Rat River (Red River of the North tributary)
Red Deer River
Red River of the North
Roaring River
Roseau River

S
Saskatchewan River
Seal River
Seine River
Shell River
Silcox Creek
Sky Pilot Creek
Souris River
Sturgeon Creek
Sturgeon River
Swan River
Swift Creek

T
Tiny Creek
Turtle River

V
Valley River
Vamp Creek
Vermilion River

W
Waterhen River
Weir River
Wesachewan River
Whitefish River
Whitemouth River
Whitemud River
Whiteshell River
Willow Creek
Winnipeg River
Wolf River
Woody River

See also
List of rivers of Canada
List of tributaries of Hudson Bay
Rivers of the Americas

Manitoba

Rivers